Blockbuster Pavilion can refer to:

Blockbuster Pavilion Charlotte, later Verizon Wireless Amphitheatre and PNC Music Pavilion, in Charlotte, North Carolina
Blockbuster Pavilion San Bernardino, later Glen Helen Pavilion and Hyundai Pavilion and San Manuel Amphitheater, in Devore, California